Collix is a genus of moths in the family Geometridae first described by Achille Guenée in 1857.

Species

 Collix adamata
 Collix angustipennis
 Collix astathes
 Collix basicristata
 Collix biokoensis
 Collix blosyra
 Collix brevipalpis
 Collix elongata
 Collix erythroides
 Collix examplata
 Collix foraminata
 Collix ghosha  Walker, 1862  (from India)
 Collix griseipalpis Wileman, 1916 (from India)
 Collix haploscelis
 Collix hirtivena
 Collix hypospilata  Guenée, 1858 (from India)
 Collix inaequata
 Collix infecta
 Collix intrepida
 Collix lasiospila
 Collix leuciota Prout, 1924 (from India)
 Collix mesopora
 Collix multifilata
 Collix muscosata
 Collix olivia
 Collix patricia
 Collix praetenta
 Collix psephena
 Collix purpurilita
 Collix rhabdoneura
 Collix rufidorsata
 Collix rufipalpis (Hampson, 1907) (from India)
 Collix stellata Warren, 1894 (from India)
 Collix stenoplia
 Collix suffusca
 Collix ustimacula

References

External links

 
Melanthiini
Geometridae genera